H&M is a Swedish multinational retail-clothing company.

H&M may also refer to:

 Harold and Maude, a film
 Hartley & Marks Publishers, a Canadian publishing firm
 Howard and Moore Complete Checklist of the Birds of the World, an ornithological checklist
 Hudson & Manhattan Railroad, now operated as PATH (rail system)
 Henry Molaison, a famous patient in neuroscience who, after removal of hippocampus for seizures, had difficulties in formation of memories